Shea Campbell is a Northern Irish former professional footballer who played as a striker and is currently first team manager at Armagh City.

Career
Campbell moved from Ballymena United to Linfield in January 2005. He was released in July 2005 due to a lack of first-team football. Campbell went on trial with Newry City in August 2005, but he wasn't offered a contract, and he instead moved to Glenavon later that same month. While at Glenavon, Campbell spent a loan spell with Armagh City, and the move became permanent in January 2006. Campbell re-signed for Dungannon Swifts in April 2007. Campbell then re-signed for Glenavon in August 2009. After one season playing at right-back for Glenavon, Campbell left the club for a short spell at Loughgall. Despite making a stunning start to his career with Loughgall, his time there was to be short-lived as he returned to Armagh City for a fourth spell at the Holm Park club. In the summer of 2011 Campbell once again signed for first club Dungannon Swifts, Campbell then went on to  have a spell for Portadown based Championship 2 side, Annagh United. In 2017 Shea returned to Armagh City scoring 13 goals in 15 appearances before stepping in to take over the reins as first team manager in the summer of 2019.

References

1981 births
Living people
Dungannon Swifts F.C. players
Ballymena United F.C. players
Armagh City F.C. players
Linfield F.C. players
Glenavon F.C. players
Cliftonville F.C. players
Loughgall F.C. players
NIFL Premiership players
Association football forwards
Association footballers from Northern Ireland
Annagh United F.C. players